The League Algiers Football Association 1955–56 season started on September 4, 1955 and ended on June 23, 1956. This is the 34th edition of this league championships which saw the consecration of the Groupement Sportif Orléansville in Division Honneur, Olympique Hussein Dey in Honor Promotion of Montpensier Berre-Sports Association first Division Sporting Club Duperre in Second Division and Entente Sportive Franco Muslim Burdeau in Third Division.

Final results

Division Honor

Promotion Honneur

First Division 
 Groupe I
 Groupe II
 Groupe III
 Results of Playoffs First Division

Second Division 
 Groupe I
 Groupe II
 Groupe III
 Groupe IV
 Results of Playoffs Second Division

Third Division 
 Groupe I
 Groupe II
 Groupe III
 Groupe IV
 Results of Playoffs Third Division

References

External links
League Algiers

League Algiers Football Association seasons
1955–56 in Algerian football
Algeria